The Erjie Rice Barn, also known as the Erjie Peasant Association Barn, is a former barn in Wujie Township, Yilan County, Taiwan.

History
The Erjie Rice Barn was built in 1928, when Taiwan was under Japanese rule. In 1935, a large brick storage warehouse and a mill were added to store public grain in the Wujie Township area. The warehouses were expanded in 1937 and 1953. During the Second World War, the Erjie Peasant Association Barn was responsible for purchasing rice on the south bank of the Lanyang River. In 1993, the barn ceased to be used for rice storage . 

The Erjie Rice Barn was announced as a county-level monument on 12 August 1998. Its upkeep is currently entrusted to the Erjie Cultural Foundation. Recently, the barn was renovated into a venue for cultural preservation.

Architecture
The barn spans over an area of 3,000 m2.

Exhibitions
The barn displays the early original tools used for agricultural activities at that time, including a 3-story high rice huller.

Transportation
The barn is accessible from Erjie Station of Taiwan Railways.

See also

 List of tourist attractions in Taiwan

References

Barns in Taiwan
Buildings and structures in Yilan County, Taiwan
Tourist attractions in Yilan County, Taiwan